Secret Room is a 2013 Nigerian film directed by Eneaji Chris Eneng. 

Secret Room may also refer to:

The Secret Room, a 1969 novel by Marion Eames
"Secret Room", a song by Baboon from their 2002 album Something Good Is Going to Happen to You